John Moses Brunswick (1819 in Bremgarten, Switzerland – 25 July 1886) was the founder of the J.M. Brunswick Manufacturing Company, one of the enterprises that merged to form today's Brunswick Corporation.

Life 
Brunswick was a Jewish immigrant from Bremgarten, Switzerland. He came to the United States in 1834 and initially worked as an errand boy for a German butcher in New York City. He then moved to Philadelphia to work as an apprentice to a carriage-maker, and later to Harrisburg, Pennsylvania, where he married before moving to Cincinnati, Ohio, where he worked for two years as a steward on an old river steamer.

In 1845 he founded the J.M. Brunswick Manufacturing Company in Cincinnati. Originally Brunswick intended for his company to be in the business of making carriages, but soon after opening his machine shop he became fascinated with billiards and decided that making billiard tables would be more lucrative.

Honours 
In 1990 he became a member of the Billiard Congress of America Hall of Fame, one of the first non-Americans to receive the honor.

See also 
Moses Bensinger, son-in-law and business partner

References 

1819 births
1886 deaths
Businesspeople from Cincinnati
People from Bremgarten District
American people of Swiss-Jewish descent
Cue sports executives
19th-century American businesspeople